Raivo Järvi (23 December 1954 – 17 June 2012), commonly known under the pseudonym of Onu Raivo (Uncle Raivo) was an Estonian artist, radio personality and politician.

Early life and education
Järvi was born in Pärnu. In 1979, Järvi graduated from the Estonian Academy of Arts.

Artistic career
Järvi was a freelance artist from 1983 until 2003. He illustrated more than 22 books and wrote and illustrated one children's book.

Mass media career
Järvi appeared in a number of TV shows and radio programmes, most famously in Kõige Suurem Sõber and Onu Raivo Jutupliiats. He also appeared regularly on Radio Kuku with his show Onu Raivo rännakud.

Political career
Järvi was a member of Riigikogu since 2003. He was a member of the Estonian Reform Party.

Personal life
Järvi was married to Estonian ballerina Tatjana Järvi and had a child from a previous marriage.

He died on 17 June 2012 after a brief illness.

Awards
2001 Medal of The Order of the White Star

See also
List of Estonians

References

External links

CV

1954 births
2012 deaths
20th-century Estonian male artists
21st-century Estonian male artists
Estonian illustrators
Estonian children's book illustrators
Estonian radio personalities
Members of the Riigikogu, 2003–2007
Members of the Riigikogu, 2007–2011
Members of the Riigikogu, 2011–2015
Estonian television personalities
Estonian Reform Party politicians
Recipients of the Order of the White Star, Medal Class
Estonian Academy of Arts alumni
People from Pärnu